Domingas Embana Togna (born June 14, 1981) is a runner from Guinea-Bissau.

She competed in the marathon race at the 2007 World Championships, without finishing, and then in the 1500 metres at the 2008 Olympic Games, finishing eleventh in the heats and 33rd overall.

References

1981 births
Living people
Olympic athletes of Guinea-Bissau
Athletes (track and field) at the 2008 Summer Olympics
Bissau-Guinean female middle-distance runners
World Athletics Championships athletes for Guinea-Bissau
Bissau-Guinean female long-distance runners
Bissau-Guinean female marathon runners